Grigori Andreyevich Abrikosov (30 August 1932 – 13 April 1993) was a Soviet stage and film actor. He was the son of Andrei Abrikosov.

Filmography

Awards 

 Honored Artist of the RSFSR (1968)
 People's Artist of the RSFSR (1984)

References

External links

1932 births
1993 deaths
20th-century Russian male actors
Male actors from Moscow
Honored Artists of the RSFSR
People's Artists of the RSFSR

Russian male film actors
Russian male stage actors
Soviet male film actors
Soviet male stage actors
Burials at Novodevichy Cemetery